Gränsö Slott (English: Gränsö Castle ) is a manor house located near Västervik in Kalmar County, Sweden. Today, Gränsö  is operated as a resort.

History 
The original building  consisted of a main hall made in wood, which was built in 1807 by Olof Johan Risselskiöld. The castle was extended many times during the 19th century. 

In 1992, the castle was subject to an extensive renovation. In 1993, when the renovation was nearly finished, a devastating fire destroyed the whole building. The castle was rebuilt again in 1994, in only four months.

Today, the building is classified as a resort and is privately owned by Per Johansson.  Prior to Johansson, Robert Fleetwood was the last owner, within whose family Gränsö had been inherited since 1886.

References

External links
Gränsö Slott official webpage 

Castles in Kalmar County